Limicolaria aurora is a species of tropical air-breathing land snail, a terrestrial pulmonate gastropod mollusk in the family Achatinidae.

Distribution 
This species occurs in Cameroun and Senegal.

This species has not yet become established in the USA, but it is considered to represent a potentially serious threat as a pest, an invasive species which could negatively affect agriculture, natural ecosystems, human health or commerce. Therefore it has been suggested that this species be given top national quarantine significance in the USA.

References

Achatinidae
Gastropods described in 1839